Teton County School District No. 1 is a public school district based in Jackson, Wyoming, United States.

Geography
Teton County School District No. 1 serves all of Teton County (excluding the Yellowstone National Park portion, which isn't part of any district), including the following communities:

Incorporated places
Town of Jackson
Census-designated places (Note: All census-designated places are unincorporated.)
Alta
Hoback
Moose Wilson Road
Rafter J Ranch
South Park
Teton Village
Wilson
Unincorporated places
Kelly
Moose
Moran

Schools

High schools
Grades 9-12
Jackson Hole High School
Summit High School (Alternative)

Middle school
Grades 6-8
Jackson Hole Middle School

Elementary schools
Grades K-5
Jackson Elementary School
Colter Elementary School
Kelly Elementary School
Moran Elementary School
Wilson Elementary School
Munger Mountain Elementary School
Grades K-6
Alta Elementary School

Student demographics
The following figures are as of October 1, 2008.

Total District Enrollment: 2,294
Student enrollment by gender
Male: 1,168 (50.92%)
Female: 1,126 (49.08%)
Student enrollment by ethnicity
White (not Hispanic): 1,693 (73.80%)
Hispanic: 546 (23.80%)
Asian or Pacific Islander: 39 (1.70%)
American Indian or Alaskan Native: 9 (0.39%)
Black (not Hispanic): 7 (0.31%)

See also
List of school districts in Wyoming

References

External links
Teton County School District No. 1 – official site.

Education in Teton County, Wyoming
School districts in Wyoming